Derbyshire County Cricket Club in 1883 was the cricket season when the English club Derbyshire had been playing for twelve years. They won two first class matches out of ten.

1883 season

Derbyshire played  two county matches each against Lancashire, Yorkshire, Surrey and Sussex, and two against MCC. They won two of their matches and lost six. Robert Smith was captain for his eighth and last season. In a sparse season without any centuries, Wallis Evershed was top scorer and William Cropper James Brelsford shared the most wickets.

There were no long term additions to the team but George Earl, Joseph Needham, George Yates and  Percy Exham made their only career appearances and Thomas Evans made his two career appearances for Derbyshire during the season. The season also saw the last appearances of John Richardson who had been a steady bowler since 1878 and George Osborne who had played since 1879.

Matches

{| class="wikitable" width="100%"
! bgcolor="#efefef" colspan=6 | List of  first class matches
|- bgcolor="#efefef"
!No.
!Date
!V
!Result 
!Margin
!Notes
|- 
|1
| 17 May 1883
| Lancashire   Old Trafford, Manchester 
|bgcolor="#FF0000"|Lost 
| Innings and 160 runs
|  George Nash  5-24; RG Barlow  5-20 
|- 
|2
| 21 May 1883 
|  Surrey   County Ground, Derby 
|bgcolor="#00FF00"|Won
| 51 runs
|  ED Barratt 5-25 and 7-76; J Brelsford  5-31
|- 
|3
|  31 May 1883 
| MCC     Lord's Cricket Ground, St John's Wood 
|bgcolor="#FF0000"|Lost 
| Innings and 29 runs
|  W Flowers 131 and 6-44; A Rylott 5-53 
|- 
|4
|  25 Jun 1883 
| Lancashire   County Ground, Derby 
|bgcolor="#FF0000"|Lost 
| Innings and 78 runs
|  A Watson 6-40 and 6-27 
|- 
|5
|09 Jul 1883 
| MCC   <small> County Ground, Derby </small
|bgcolor="#FFCC00"|Drawn
|
|  SH Evershed  5–19; GG Hearne 5-49; W Cropper 5-25
|- 
 |6
| 19 Jul 1883 
| Yorkshire  County Ground, Derby 
|bgcolor="#FFCC00"|Drawn
|
|  W Chatterton 5-61
|- 
|7
| 30 Jul 1883  
|  Sussex    County Ground, Derby 
|bgcolor="#FF0000"|Lost 
| Innings and 68 runs
|  JB Hide 5-34
|- 
|8
|  06 Aug 1883 
| YorkshireBramall Lane, Sheffield 
|bgcolor="#FF0000"|Lost 
| Innings and 3 runs
|  W Chatterton 6-64; E Peate  5-36 
|- 
|9
| 30 Aug 1883  
|  Surrey Kennington Oval 
|bgcolor="#FF0000"|Lost 
| 6 wickets
|  ED Barratt 5-50
|- 
|10
| 03 Sep 1883 
|  Sussex     County Ground, Hove 
|bgcolor="#00FF00"|Won
| 29 runs
|  J Marlow 6-27
|-

Statistics

First-class batting averages

First-class bowling averages

Wicket keeping
James Disney  Catches 10, Stumping 0

See also
Derbyshire County Cricket Club seasons
1883 English cricket season

References

1883 in English cricket
Derbyshire County Cricket Club seasons
English cricket seasons in the 19th century